Christopher Moore is an Australian viola player. He is the Principal Viola of the Melbourne Symphony Orchestra and was previously Principal Viola of Australian Chamber Orchestra. Together with Richard Tognetti and Australian Chamber Orchestra Moore was nominated for the 2010 ARIA Award for Best Classical Album for the album Mozart Violin Concertos.

Discography
Richard Tognetti, Christopher Moore & Australian Chamber Orchestra  
Mozart Violin Concertos (2010) - BIS Records

References

External links
Christopher Moore - Melbourne Symphony Orchestra

Australian musicians
Living people
Year of birth missing (living people)